Izvorul may refer to the following places:

Rivers in Romania

 Izvorul Bogat, a tributary of the Tecșe in Covasna County
 Izvorul Căldării, a tributary of the Râul Mare
 Izvorul Coastelor, a tributary of the Topolog in Argeș County
 Izvorul Dimei, a tributary of the Vâlsan in Argeș County
 Izvorul Dorului, a tributary of the Prahova in Prahova County
 Izvorul Dragoșu, headwater of the Bughea in Argeș County
 Izvorul Foișorului, a tributary of the Dâmbovița in Argeș County
 Izvorul Groșilor, a tributary of the Râul Doamnei in Argeș County
 Izvorul Hotarului, a tributary of the Dâmbovița in Argeș County
 Izvorul Iezerului, a tributary of the Târnava in Alba County
 Izvorul Lerescu, a tributary of the Bârsa in Brașov County
 Izvorul Lung, a tributary of the Bistrița in Bistrița-Năsăud County
 Izvorul Mare, a tributary of the Anieș in Bistrița-Năsăud County
 Izvorul Mare, a tributary of the Caraș in Caraș-Severin County
 Izvorul Mare, a tributary of the Repedea in Vâlcea County
 Izvorul Mioarelor, a tributary of the Râul Doamnei in Argeș County
 Izvorul Mircii, a tributary of the Buda in Argeș County
 Izvorul Negovanului, headwater of the Sădurel in Sibiu County
 Izvorul Popii, a tributary of the Vâlsan in Argeș County
 Izvorul Porcului, a tributary of the Zârna in Argeș County
 Izvorul Războiului, a tributary of the Bâsca Mică in Buzău County
 Izvorul Roșu, a tributary of the Pârâul Băilor in Bistrița-Năsăud County
 Izvorul Roșu, a tributary of the Văsălatu in Argeș County
 Izvorul Sașa, a tributary of the Călinești in Vâlcea County
 Izvorul Surlei, a tributary of the Râul Doamnei in Argeș County
 Izvorul Tomnatecului, a tributary of the Lotrioara in Sibiu County
 Izvorul Vacii, a tributary of the Sădurel in Sibiu County
 Izvorul Zănoaga, headwater of the Bughea in Argeș County
 Izvorul Zănoagei, a tributary of the Brătei in Dâmbovița County

Other
 Lake Izvorul Muntelui, the largest artificial lake on the interior waters of Romania

See also 
 Izvor (disambiguation)
 Izvoare (disambiguation)
 Izvoarele (disambiguation)
 Izvorașu River (disambiguation)
 Izvorul Alb (disambiguation)
 Izvorul cu Hotar River (disambiguation)
 Izvorul Gropii (disambiguation)
 Izvorul Negru (disambiguation)